St John Street may refer to:

 St John Street, London, England
 St John Street, Oxford, England

See also 
 St John's Street (disambiguation)

Odonyms referring to religion